Brett McDermott (born 10 September 1978) is an English mixed martial artist, and former professional rugby league footballer. In rugby he represented Ireland, and played club level for every Cumbrian clubs except Carlisle Border Raiders. In MMA, he has been a professional competitor since 2013 and is the current BAMMA Heavyweight Champion. McDermott also competed for Rizin and Bellator MMA.

Rugby league
McDermott, who competed in professional rugby for 15 seasons, was playing for Barrow in 2009. He also represented Ireland, including games against France in 2010.

On 30 March 2011, McDermott announced his retirement from rugby league. A couple of days later, he later admitted that he had retired after being charged by the Rugby Football League (RFL) for failing a drugs test. In June 2011, the RFL confirmed that McDermott was banned for two years after testing positive for drostanolone and 19-norandrosterone.

Mixed martial arts career
After being banned from rugby league, McDermott became a MMA fighter. In 2013, he turned professional and fought Thomas Denham at BAMMA 12, but lost by submission.

McDermott competed in the Rizin Fighting Federation Heavyweight Tournament on 29 December 2015, losing in the quarterfinals against former Strikeforce Light Heavyweight Champion Muhammed Lawal by knockout.

McDermott stepped in on a few days notice as a replacement for Vladimir Filipovic to face Liam McGeary in the main event at Bellator 173. He lost the fight via TKO in the second round.

Personal life
McDermott is married with three children. He is of Irish descent.

Mixed martial arts record

|-
|Win
|align=center| 9–5
| Tony Mustard
| TKO (punches)
|MTK MMA PROBELLUM
|
|align=center|1
|align=center|2.40
|Liverpool
|
|-
|Win
|align=center| 8–5
| Ruben Wolf
| TKO (punches)
|BAMMA 29
|
|align=center|2
|align=center|0.54
|Birmingham
| 
|-
|Loss
|align=center| 7–5
|Liam McGeary
| TKO (doctor stoppage)
|Bellator 173
|
|align=center|2
|align=center|1:06
|Belfast, Northern Ireland
|Catchweight bout of 215 lbs.
|-
|Win
|align=center| 7–4
| Dan Konecke
| TKO (punches)
|Full Contact Contender 17
|
|align=center|2
|align=center|2:50
|Manchester, England
|
|-
|Loss
|align=center| 6–4
| Kenneth Bergh
| Submission (guillotine)
|Clash of the Titans 16
|
|align=center| 1
|align=center| 1:02
|Cumbria, England
|
|-
|Win
|align=center| 6–3 
| Jamie Sloane
| KO (punch)
|BAMMA 25
|
|align=center| 1
|align=center| 3:58
|Birmingham, England
|
|-
| Loss
| align=center| 5–3
| Muhammed Lawal
| KO (punches)
| Rizin World Grand Prix 2015: Part 1 - Saraba
| 
|align=center| 1
| align=center| 9:20
| Saitama, Japan
|
|-
| Win
| align=center| 5–2
| Pelu Adetola
| TKO (punches)
| BAMMA 23
| 
| align=center| 1
| align=center| 1:57
| Birmingham, England
| 
|-
| Loss
| align=center| 4–2
| Marcin Lazarz
| Decision (unanimous)
| BAMMA 20
| 
| align=center| 3
| align=center| 5:00
| Birmingham, England
| 
|-
| Win
| align=center| 4–1
| Oli Thompson
| KO (punches)
| BAMMA 17
| 
| align=center| 1
| align=center| 1:43
| Manchester, England
| 
|-
| Win
| align=center| 3–1
| Paul Bennett
| KO (punch)
| Stoke Fight Factory: Rage in the Cage 4
| 
| align=center| 1
| align=center| 1:09
| Stoke-on-Trent, England
| 
|-
| Win
| align=center| 2–1
| Shaun Lomas
| Decision (unanimous)
| Stoke Fight Factory: Rage in the Cage 3
| 
| align=center| 3
| align=center| 5:00
| Stoke-on-Trent, England
|
|-
| Win
| align=center| 1–1
| Jason Tyldesley
| TKO (punches)
| AMFC 2: Alpha Male Fighting Championships 2
| 
| align=center| 1
| align=center| 1:20
| Scarborough, England
| 
|-
| Loss
| align=center| 0–1
| Thomas Denham
| Submission (rear-naked choke)
| BAMMA 12
| 
| align=center| 2
| align=center| 3:58
| Newcastle upon Tyne, England
|

Championships and accomplishments
Rugby league

Whitehaven
National League One
Champions - 2005

Barrow Raiders
Division Two Championship
 Champions – 2009
 Minor premiership – 2009

BAMMA
BAMMA World Heavyweight Championship (One time; first)

References

External links
Statistics at rugbyleagueproject.org

Living people
1978 births
Barrow Raiders players
Doping cases in rugby league
English male mixed martial artists
English people of Irish descent
English rugby league players
English sportspeople in doping cases
Heavyweight mixed martial artists
Ireland national rugby league team players
Light heavyweight mixed martial artists
Rugby league players from Cumbria
Whitehaven R.L.F.C. players
Workington Town players